Javier Arturo McFarlane Olazabál (born 21 October 1991) is a Peruvian track and field athlete who competes mainly in the 110 metres hurdles and long jump. He was the hurdles gold medallist at the South American Games in 2014 and the South American Championships in Athletics in 2015.

He competed internationally from a young age and won several medals at the South American Under-23 Championships in Athletics. He also has represented his country at the Pan American Games and Summer Universiade. His brother Jorge McFarlane is also a hurdles/long jumper and a South American champion.

Career

Early career
Born in Lima, McFarlane followed his older brother, Jorge, into the sport of athletics. While his brother specialised in hurdling and long jump, Javier McFarlane began with combined track and field events and was the winner of the octathlon at the 2008 South American Youth Championships in Athletics, which was held in his native Lima. He also managed a bronze medal in the 110 m hurdles. The sixteen-year-old Peruvian also competed at the higher age category 2008 South American Under-23 Championships in Athletics, also held in Lima that year: he was last in the hurdles (an event his brother won), but helped the Peruvian 4×100 metres relay team to the bronze medals. After 2008 he did not compete in combined events and began to mirror the specialities of his brother.

At the 2009 South American Junior Championships, he struggled to adapt to the higher age group and was fifth in the long jump and failed to finish the hurdles. With the South American Senior Championships being held in Lima, he was allowed to compete for the host nation and was fifth in the long and relay, but last in the hurdles heats. The McFarlane brothers performed well at the combined 2010 South American U23 Championships/South American Games: Javier placed third in both the long jump and hurdles while Jorge took the golds. Javier McFarlane's long jump bronze was ranked as a silver medal in the South American Games element of the competition, as the runner-up Jhamal Bowen of Panama was not registered to compete.

McFarlane made his global debut in both long jump and hurdles at the 2010 World Junior Championships in Athletics, but was not competitive at that level and was eliminated in the first round of both. He met a similar fate at the Universiade the year after, and also placed last in sixteenth at the Pan American Games. His last international performance in age category competitions came at the 2012 South American Under-23 Championships. He focused on the hurdles there and finished fourth.

Senior competition
McFarlane began to establish himself as a senior level athlete in the 2013 season. At the 2013 South American Championships in Athletics he set a personal best of 13.85 seconds to take fourth place in the hurdles, while his brother won in a Peruvian record time. Both were also in action in the long jump, with Javier coming eighth. Two senior medals followed at the Bolivarian Games, held on home turf in Trujillo, where he was third in the hurdles and second in the long jump (Jorge won both). The 2014 South American Games marked a coming of age for 22-year-old as he claimed his first senior gold medal in the 110 m hurdles in a personal best time of 13.77 seconds. He was also fifth in the long jump, beating his brother in both disciplines. The hurdles final at the 2014 Ibero-American Championships in Athletics proved to be a family affair as Jorge beat Javier to the title by a margin of five hundredths of a second. The winning time of 13.53 was a national record and Javier McFarlane's 13.57 seconds was a personal best – a very slow reaction time from Javier proved to be the difference between the two. He ended his season at the Pan American Sports Festival, coming fourth in the hurdles and ninth in the long jump.

McFarlane repeated continental level success at the 2015 South American Championships in Athletics, building on his South American Games title with a 110 m hurdles bronze medal in front of a home crowd in Lima, and finishing just one hundredth of a second behind his brother. He was also fourth in the long jump.

Personal bests
110 metres hurdles – 13.55 seconds (2016)
Long jump –  (2010)
Octathlon (youth) – 5772 points

International competitions

References

External links

Living people
1991 births
Sportspeople from Lima
Peruvian male hurdlers
Peruvian male long jumpers
Pan American Games competitors for Peru
Athletes (track and field) at the 2011 Pan American Games
Athletes (track and field) at the 2018 South American Games
Athletes (track and field) at the 2019 Pan American Games
South American Games gold medalists for Peru
South American Games silver medalists for Peru
South American Games bronze medalists for Peru
South American Games medalists in athletics
Competitors at the 2011 Summer Universiade
21st-century Peruvian people